I Have Some Questions for You is a mystery novel by Rebecca Makkai. The novel received positive critical reception upon release.

Plot 
Bodie Kane, a film professor and podcaster, is forced to confront a series of violent events in her past when she is invited to teach a class at the New Hampshire boarding school she graduated from.

Development history

Publication history 
I Have Some Questions for You was published on February 21, 2023 by Viking Press.

Reception 
I Have Some Questions for You drew praise from critics upon its release.

The Associated Press praised the novel's plot but criticized the characters and their development. The Star Tribune and The Wall Street Journal both published positive reviews, with the former praising the novel's "nuance" and the latter positively describing the "expressive imagery" of Makkai's writing. Ron Charles, writing in The Washington Post, characterized the novel as standing apart from other "prep-school novels" by situating much of the novel's drama within the world outside the school. Positive reviews were also published in The New York Times, The New Yorker, and The Boston Globe.

Publishers Weekly praised the book, drawing a positive comparison to Makkai's previous novel, The Great Believers, writing that "this is sure to be a hit." Kirkus Reviews, while positive overall, negatively compared the book to The Great Believers, noting that "this book does not have the profound impact of its predecessor." Booklist and Bookpage both published starred reviews, praising the novel's prose, Bodie's characterization, and what they felt was a subtle message about racism and misogyny.

References

External links 

 I Have Some Questions for You at BookMarks

2023 American novels
English-language novels
American mystery novels
Novels set in boarding schools
Viking Press books